Potato Range may refer to:

Alagalla Mountain Range, a mountain range in Sri Lanka
Potato Range (British Columbia), a mountain range in Canada